Alkanindiges is a genus of gram-negative alkane-degrading bacteria which belong to the class  Gammaproteobacteria and which occurs in activated sludge systems.

References

Moraxellaceae
Bacteria genera